Poets' Corner is the name traditionally given to a section of the south transept of Westminster Abbey in London, where many poets, playwrights, and writers are buried or commemorated.

The first poet interred in Poets' Corner was Geoffrey Chaucer in 1400. William Shakespeare was commemorated with a monument in 1740, over a century after his death. Over the centuries, a tradition has grown up of interring or memorialising people there in recognition of their contribution to British culture. In the overwhelming majority of cases, the honour is awarded to writers.

In 2009, the founders of the Royal Ballet were commemorated in a memorial floor stone and on 25 September 2010, the writer Elizabeth Gaskell was celebrated with the dedication of a panel in the memorial window. On 6 December 2011, former Poet Laureate Ted Hughes was commemorated with a floor stone. On 22 November 2013, the fiftieth anniversary of his death, writer C. S. Lewis was commemorated with a memorial floor stone. The poet Philip Larkin was commemorated with a floor stone dedicated on 2 December 2016.

History

The first poet interred in Poets' Corner, Geoffrey Chaucer, owed his 1400 burial in the Abbey (in front of St. Benedict's Chapel) more to his position as Clerk of Works of the Palace of Westminster than to his fame as a writer. The erection of his magnificent tomb by Nicholas Brigham in 1556 (to where Chaucer's remains were then transferred) and the nearby burial of Edmund Spenser in 1599 began a tradition that still continues. The area also houses the tombs of several Canons and Deans of the Abbey, as well as the grave of Thomas Parr who, it is said, died at the age of 152 in 1635 after having seen ten sovereigns on the throne.

Burial or commemoration in the Abbey does not always occur at or soon after the time of death. Lord Byron, for example, whose poetry was admired but who maintained a scandalous lifestyle, died in 1824 but was not given a memorial until 1969.  Even William Shakespeare, buried at Stratford-upon-Avon in 1616, was not honoured with a monument until 1740 when one designed by William Kent was constructed in Poets' Corner (though shortly after Shakespeare's death William Basse had suggested Shakespeare should be buried there). Samuel Horsley, Dean of Westminster in 1796, was said to have tartly refused the request for actress Kitty Clive to be buried in the Abbey:

if we do not draw some line in this theatrical ambition to mortuary fame, we shall soon make Westminster Abbey little better than a Gothic Green Room!

Not all poets appreciated memorialisation and Samuel Wesley's epitaph for Samuel Butler, who supposedly died in poverty, continued Butler's satiric tone:

Some of those buried in Poets' Corner also had memorials erected to them over or near their grave, either around the time of their death or later. In some cases, such as Joseph Addison, the burial took place elsewhere in Westminster Abbey, with a memorial later erected in Poets' Corner. In some cases a full burial of a body took place, in other cases the body was cremated and the ashes buried. There are also cases where there was support for a particular individual to be buried in Poets' Corner, but the decision was made to bury them elsewhere in the Abbey, such as Edward Bulwer-Lytton. Other notable poets and writers, such as Aphra Behn, are buried elsewhere in the Abbey. At least two of the memorials (both to individuals buried in Poets' Corner – Rowe and Gay) were later moved to a location elsewhere in the Abbey due to the discovery of old paintings on the wall behind them.

Memorial types
The memorials can take several forms. Some are stone slabs set in the floor with a name and inscription carved on them, while others are more elaborate and carved stone monuments, or hanging stone tablets, or memorial busts. Some are commemorated in groups, such as the joint memorial for the Brontë sisters (commissioned in 1939, but not unveiled until 1947 due to the war), the sixteen First World War poets inscribed on a stone floor slab and unveiled in 1985, and the four founders of the Royal Ballet, commemorated together in 2009.

The grave of Ben Jonson is not in Poets' Corner, but is in the north aisle of the nave. It has the inscription "O Rare Ben Johnson" (perhaps the original spelling) on the slab above it. It has been suggested that this could be read "Orare Ben Johnson" (pray for Ben Johnson), which would indicate a deathbed return to Catholicism, but the carving shows a distinct space between "O" and "rare". The fact that he was buried in an upright grave could be an indication of his reduced circumstances at the time of his death but it has also been suggested that Jonson asked for a grave exactly 18 inches square from the monarch and received an upright grave to fit in the requested space. As well as the gravestone in the north aisle of the nave, a wall tablet commemorating Jonson was later erected in Poets' Corner.

As floor and wall space began to run out, the decision was taken to install a stained glass memorial window (unveiled in 1994 in memory of Edward Horton Hubbard), and it is here that new names are added in the form of inscribed panes of glass. There is room for 20 names, and currently there are six names on this window, with the latest entry (Elizabeth Gaskell) unveiled on 25 September 2010. The memorial ceremonies often include guest speakers. In 1995, Oscar Wilde was commemorated in the window and those in attendance included Sir John Gielgud and Dame Judi Dench who both read extracts from his work.

Burials

Memorials

First World War poets
The memorial in Poets' Corner, Westminster Abbey, to 16 Great War poets is a slate stone slab with the names of the poets inscribed on it. It was unveiled on 11 November 1985, the 67th anniversary of the Armistice. An additional inscription quotes Owen's "Preface":

The † symbol indicates poets who died during the war.

Royal Ballet
The stone slab floor memorial to the four founders of the Royal Ballet was dedicated on 17 November 2009.

Elsewhere in the Abbey
Poets and writers commemorated elsewhere in Westminster Abbey, but not in Poets' Corner proper.

See also
Poets' Corner is also the title of a play by James Huntrods, and The Poets' Corner was a book of caricatures of famous poets by Max Beerbohm published in 1904.

Notes and references

External links 
 

British poetry
Tourist attractions in London
Westminster Abbey